Santa Loves to Boogie is the 19th studio album and second Christmas album by American country band Asleep at the Wheel. Recorded at Bismeaux Studio in Austin, Texas, it was produced by the band's frontman Ray Benson with manager and engineer Sam Seifert, and released on November 7, 2006, by Benson's own label Bismeaux Productions. The album features guest performances by singers Dale Watson, Willie Nelson, Jack Ingram and Kevin Fowler on one track each.

Like the band's first Christmas album, 1997's Merry Texas Christmas, Y'all, Santa Loves to Boogie features a mix of traditional songs and original compositions written by band members and featured artists. "Pretty Paper" (featuring Willie Nelson) was originally featured on the 1997 album, while a different version of "Silent Night" was also recorded. A third Christmas album, Lone Star Christmas Night, was released in 2016 and featured several songs from Merry Texas Christmas, Y'all.

Track listing

Personnel

Asleep at the Wheel
Ray Benson – vocals, guitars, production, mixing
Elizabeth McQueen – vocals
Jason Roberts – vocals, fiddle, mandolin, guitars
Eddie Rivers – steel guitar, saxophone
David Miller – bass, backing vocals
John Michael Whitby – piano, backing vocals
David Sanger – drums, percussion

Guest performers
Glenn Fukunaga – bass
Dale Watson – vocals 
Willie Nelson – vocals 
Jack Ingram – vocals 
Kevin Fowler – vocals 
Additional personnel
Dick Reeves – art direction, design
John Wilson – cover illustration

Production personnel
Sam Seifert – production, engineering, mixing
Dan Skarbek – production assistance
Bridget Bauer – production assistance
Cris Burns – engineering
Will Armstrong – engineering
Mike Mercer – engineering
Jerry Tubb – mastering

References

External links

Asleep at the Wheel albums
2007 Christmas albums